Carl Ronald Joseph Magnay (born 20 January 1989) is a professional footballer who plays as a defender for Gateshead. Due to having Northern Irish grandparents, English-born Magnay is eligible to represent Northern Ireland or the Republic of Ireland. He made his international debut the Northern Ireland U-21 team on Tuesday 11 August 2009, in an away friendly against Portugal's U-21 team.

Career

Chelsea
Born in Gateshead, Tyne and Wear, Magnay was the winner of the second series of the Sky One talent search Football Icon. Prior to this Magnay was part of Leeds United's academy and also played part-time for Birtley Town Washington F.C. and Esh Winning. Magnay's father was the secretary at Birtley Town and he received a phone call from Sky explaining that they were looking for players to take part. Magnay attended alongside his friend Mark Anderson. Before appearing on Football Icon, Magnay had been on trial with Middlesbrough. On 30 July 2007, ChelseaTV Online conducted an interview with Magnay, where it was revealed he had signed professional forms with the club.

In January 2009 he was loaned to League One team Milton Keynes Dons. He made his debut for the Dons on 31 January against Cheltenham Town. He made only one other appearance and in total played 7 minutes for MK. On 9 March 2009 Magnay was signed by Northampton Town on a one-month loan deal. He made his debut in the 1–0 defeat at Millwall.

In pre-season ahead of the 2009–10 Premier League campaign, Magnay was a part of the Chelsea Reserves team that took part in a training ground brawl with United Arab Emirates side Al-Ahli.

In March 2010 Magnay suffered a serious injury in a reserve team game against Charlton Athletic, damaging his anterior cruciate ligament, medial collateral ligament and cracking his kneecap.

On 16 June 2011, it was announced that Magnay had been released by Chelsea having made no senior appearances in a spell plagued by injury. Also, Chelsea reserve team coach Steve Holland made this comment in an article which confirmed the departure of two other players: 'Carl Magnay will remain at Chelsea for the rest of this year and he is well informed of how the club see him. He is another who had an awful run of injuries and we try to look after our players. Hopefully over the next six months we can help place him at a good level of football.'

Gateshead
In January 2012, Magnay appeared on trial at Gateshead, playing for Gateshead's reserve side in a Durham Challenge Cup match against Norton & Stockton Ancients on 11 January and a Central League game against Hartlepool United Reserves on 25 January. On 27 January 2012, he signed for Gateshead on a contract until the end of the season. He made his debut on 6 March, as an 86th-minute substitute in a 2–0 win over Hayes & Yeading United. He agreed a new one-year contract with the club in May 2012 to cover the 2012–13 season. Magnay scored his first career goal on 29 January 2013 against Barrow in the FA Trophy. He scored his first league goal on 13 April 2013 against Hereford United. Magnay started in the 2014 Conference Premier play-off Final against Cambridge United, a 2–1 defeat. After making 77 appearances for the club, Magnay was released at the end of the 2013–14 season.

Grimsby Town
On 15 July 2014, Magnay signed for Conference Premier side Grimsby Town on a one-year contract. On 26 April 2015, he picked up six awards including "Supporters Player of the Year" award, at the club's annual presentation.

Hartlepool United
On 1 June 2015, Magnay joined Hartlepool United after a successful spell at Grimsby where he helped his team finish third in the Conference Premier.
 On 5 September 2015, Magnay was accused of spitting at a spectator after receiving a red card in a defeat to Wycombe Wanderers. He was suspended by the FA for six matches and fined £750.
Magnay made 33 league appearances in his first season for Hartlepool. He scored twice in a 3–3 draw at Crewe Alexandra. In September 2016, Magnay ruptured his anterior cruciate ligament in a match with Mansfield Town.

At the start of the 2017–18 season, he was named Hartlepool's captain by new boss Craig Harrison. In March 2018, Magnay made headlines when scored a goal from 40-yards for Hartlepool on live TV in a relegation battle against Barrow. Magnay signed a new one-year deal with the club at the end of the 2017–18 season.

Magnay was replaced by Andrew Davies as club captain at the start of the 2018–19 season by the club's new manager Matthew Bates. Bates said of the appointment: "Carl (Magnay) hasn't done anything wrong but I spoke to him during the summer and made it clear it was nothing against him but told him I was looking to bring in someone with more experience. If you look at this squad you can probably name quite a few contenders for the skipper's job off the top of your head with Andrew, Carl, Scott Loach, Nicky Featherstone and Liam Noble. That's good and it's what we want because it's about everyone stepping up to the plate and pushing the lads along as a group."

Spennymoor Town
On 16 July 2019, Spennymoor Town announced the signing of Magnay. Magnay stated that he switched to part-time football so that he could pursue coaching and scouting opportunities.

On 9 December 2021, Magnay departed Spennymoor by mutual consent. He made 42 appearances in all competitions for the Moors.

Return to Gateshead
On 7 January 2022, Magnay re-signed for National League North side Gateshead on a short-term contract until the end of the 2021–22 season making the switch back to full-time football. His first goal, in his second spell, came in a 2–2 draw against Chorley on 2 May 2022. The result meant that Gateshead had secured the National League North title. At the end of the season, Magnay signed a new one–year deal with the club.

Coaching career
In January 2015, while earning his coaching badges, Magnay started coaching at Pro Player Football Academy. In September 2019, Magnay began working for his former club Chelsea as a youth talent scout in the north of England.

Career statistics

Club

Honours
Gateshead
National League North: 2021–22

Individual
Grimsby Town Supporters Player of the Year: 2014–15

References

External links

1989 births
Living people
Footballers from Gateshead
English footballers
Association footballers from Northern Ireland
Northern Ireland under-21 international footballers
Association football defenders
Leeds United F.C. players
Birtley Town F.C. players
Esh Winning F.C. players
Chelsea F.C. players
Milton Keynes Dons F.C. players
Northampton Town F.C. players
Gateshead F.C. players
Grimsby Town F.C. players
Hartlepool United F.C. players
Spennymoor Town F.C. players
English Football League players
National League (English football) players